John Maggio is an American documentary film director, writer and producer. He is best known for his films The Perfect Weapon (HBO), Panic: The Untold Story of the 2008 Financial Crisis (HBO) and The Newspaperman (HBO) as well as his work with the PBS series American Experience and Frontline.

Life and career

Maggio began his career as a musician as one of the founding members of the band, The Crosswalk with Cody ChesnuTT. Their debut album, Venus Loves A Melody was produced by Hollywood Records in 1999 with the legendary mixer Bob Clearmountain. After the band was dropped from their label Maggio pursued a career in documentary film and has been a partner at  Brooklyn based film company Ark Media since 2003. His latest film A Choice of Weapons: Inspired by Gordon Parks (HBO) will have its world premier at the 2021 Tribeca Film Festival. He is also currently at work on a film about Italian fashion called Milano.

Filmography

Awards and nominations

References

External links
 

Living people
American documentary film directors
American documentary film producers
St. Joseph's Collegiate Institute alumni
Year of birth missing (living people)